The Women's 3 metre springboard competition at the 2019 World Aquatics Championships was held on 18 and 19 July 2019.

Results
The preliminary round was started on 18 July at 10:00. The semifinal was held on 18 July at 15:30. The final was started on 19 July at 20:45.

Green denotes finalists

Blue denotes semifinalists

References

Women's 3 metre springboard